Phrissomidius guineensis is a species of beetle in the family Cerambycidae, and the only species in the genus Phrissomidius. It was described by Stephan von Breuning in 1939.

It's 15–17 mm long and 5–5.5 mm wide, and its type locality is  Sierra Leone.

References

Morimopsini
Beetles described in 1939
Taxa named by Stephan von Breuning (entomologist)